This is a list of elections held in Ottawa, Ontario. Direct elections for mayor have been held continuously since 1873.

City of Ottawa mayoral election results since 1888

1888
McLeod Stewart, 1,957
W. E. Brown, 1643
Ald. Lewis, 360

1889
Jacob Erratt, 2,823
Dr. Valade, 2,345

1890
Jacob Erratt, 2,620
Lewis, 1,419

1891
Thomas Birkett, 2,396
Dr. St. Jean, 1,459
John Heney, 1,095
Alex MacLean, 385

1892
Olivier Durocher, 2,280
George Cox, 2,199

1893
Olivier Durocher, acclaimed

1894
George Cox, 2,289
C. R. Cunningham, 1,663
William R. Stroud, 1,549

1895
William Borthwick, 3,277
William Cluff, 3,188

1896
William Borthwick, acclaimed

1897
Samuel Bingham, 2,712
Levi Crannell, 2,558
William Cluff, 1,869

1898
Samuel Bingham, acclaimed

1899
Thomas Payment, 3,067
Robert Stewart, 2,424
William Cluff, 2,301

1900
Thomas Payment, 3,626
William Campbell, 3,240

1901
William Dowler Morris, 3,436
Fred Cook, 1,590
Thomas Raphael, 1,534
Thomas Butler, 266
Samuel J. Davis, 194
William Campbell, 175

1902
Fred Cook, acclaimed

1903
Fred Cook, acclaimed

1904
James A. Ellis, 3,992
D'Arcy Scott, 3,333
J. C. Enright, 777

1905
James A. Ellis, 4,623
William Dowler Morris, 4,146

1906
James A. Ellis, 4,773
A. A. Taillon, 4,523
William G. Black, 59

1907
D'Arcy Scott, 3,988
Charles Hopewell, 3,800
William Dowler Morris, 1,570
William G. Black, 171

1908
D'Arcy Scott, acclaimed

1909
Charles Hopewell, acclaimed

1910
Charles Hopewell, acclaimed

1911
Charles Hopewell, 4,968
A. E. Caron, 4,411
Roberts, 331

1912
Charles Hopewell, 4,146
E. J. Laverdure, 3,892
P. D. Ross, 3,323

1913
James A. Ellis, 5,816
E. J. Laverdure, 5,038
George Wilson, 1,572

1914
Taylor McVeity, 7,184
James A. Ellis, 6,883

1915
Nelson D. Porter, 7,539
Taylor McVeity, 7,124

1916
Nelson D. Porter, acclaimed

1917
Harold Fisher, 6,122
Nelson D. Porter, 4,392
Taylor McVeity, 2,391

1918
Harold Fisher, acclaimed

1919
Harold Fisher 7,624
Rufus H. Parent 4,642

1920
Harold Fisher 7,962
G. C. Hurdman 5,608

1921
Frank H. Plant 7,826
Joseph Kent 7,804
(results after recount)

1922
Frank H. Plant 10,923
Joseph Kent 4,698
W. K. McManus 241

1923
Frank H. Plant, acclaimed

1924 (January)
Henry Watters 14,641
Frank H. Plant 9,969
Taylor McVeity 736

1924 (December)
John P. Balharrie  15,159 
Arthur Ellis  8,405 
W. E. Brown   1,546

1925
John P. Balharrie, acclaimed

1926
John P. Balharrie 12,336
Patrick Nolan 6,354
Frank H. Plant 6,273

1927
Arthur Ellis 11,183
John P. Balharrie 8,415
Patrick Nolan 7,805

1928
Arthur Ellis, acclaimed

1929
Frank H. Plant, acclaimed

1930
John J. Allen, acclaimed

1931
John J. Allen, acclaimed

1932
John J. Allen 16,295
Andrew F. Macallum 8,898
Charles J. Tulley 6,543

1933
Patrick Nolan 19,634
John J. Allen 13,577
Peter Alex Cray 387
Dudley Booth 356

1934
Patrick Nolan 27,064
Albert H. Cole 2,394
William P. Clermont 1,380
James Connah 327
Edward E. Kesteron 266

1935
J. E. Stanley Lewis 17,810
Fulgence Charpentier 9,755
Patrick Nolan 6,414
Edward H. Hinchey 2,164

1936
J. E. Stanley Lewis 22,065
Albert H. Cole 3,025
William Watson 1,008

1937
J. E. Stanley Lewis 18,186 
William H. Marsden 12,255
Caleb Green 324
William Watson 284

1938
J. E. Stanley Lewis 17,958
William H. Marsden 11,457
George H. Dunbar 6,788
Caleb Green 201
William Watson 133

1939
J. E. Stanley Lewis 15,685
Finley McRae 11,941
S. Leonard Belaire 5,260

1940
J. E. Stanley Lewis 19,729
S. Leonard Belaire 11,692

1942
J. E. Stanley Lewis 18,279
S. Leonard Belaire 7,496
C. E. Pickering 5,408
Lorenzo Lafleur 3,584

1944
J. E. Stanley Lewis 17,814
C. E. Pickering 7,602
V. Cyril Phelan 5,997

1946
J. E. Stanley Lewis 22,650
Sydney T. Checkland 3,160

1948
E. A. Bourque 16,150
Grenville Goodwin 15,229
G. M. Geldert 14,547

1950
Grenville Goodwin 28,698
E. A. Bourque 18,668
G. M. Geldert 12,928

1952
Charlotte Whitton 37,373
Len Coulter 33,498

1954
Charlotte Whitton 33,078
David Luther Burgess 22,757
E. A. Bourque 13,469

1956
George H. Nelms acclaimed

1958
George H. Nelms 28,346
William J. LeClair 13,572
Roy Donaldson 8,774

1960
Charlotte Whitton 35,532
Sam Berger 33,825
Ernie W. Jones 9,317
Lucien A. Dube 2,675

1962
Charlotte Whitton 40,062
Sam Berger 34,044
R.J. Groves 18,245

1964
Don B. Reid 43,991
Frank Ryan 26,996
Charlotte Whitton 25,608
Joseph Louis Paradis 706
Alfred Lapointe 395

1966
Don B. Reid 59,082
Donald V. Sterling 15,445
John Kroeker 2,273
Lucien A. Dube 947
Alfred Lapointe (withdrew)

1969
Ken H. Fogarty 57,890
John Kroeker 5,182
Joseph Louis Paradis 3,781
David E. Porter 2,304
Lucien A. Dube 2,083

1972
Pierre Benoit 57,634
Alphonse Frederick Lapointe 2,520
Oscar Orenstein 2,095
Jack Ridout 1,602

1974
Lorry Greenberg 33,679
Tom McDougall 29,316
Stuart Langford 2,867
Alphonse Frederick Lapointe 1,584

1976
Lorry Greenberg 48,048
Alphonse Frederick Lapointe 3,377
Bill Foster 3,076
Mike Sammon 2,489

1978
Marion Dewar 51,791
Pat Nicol 32,033
Bernard Pelot 8,439
Alphonse Frederick Lapointe 1,858
Eddie Turgeon 730
Ian Orenstein 597

1980
Marion Dewar 49,687
Pat Nicol 33,151
Alphonse Frederick Lapointe 2,357
John Turmel 1,928

1982
Marion Dewar 57,168
Darrel Kent 48,461
T. Joseph McCarthy 2,060
Marc Gauvin 1,725
Arnold Guetta 487

1985
Jim Durrell 56,988
Marlene Catterall 35,711
R. Allan Jones 942
Walter J. McPhee 886
Nabil Fawzry 529

1988
Jim Durrell 69,813
Michael Bartholomew 4,800
John Turmel 3,123
John Kroeker 1,704
Nabil Fawzry 1,022

1991
Jacquelin Holzman 38,725
Nancy Smith 35,525
Marc Laviolette 21,101
Michael Bartholomew 2,417

1994
Jacquelin Holzman 34,082
Joan O'Neill 28,748
Tim Kehoe 24,773
Diane McIntyre 2,921
Alexander Saikaley 1,677

1997
Jim Watson 54,148
Robert G. Gauthier 8,037
Alexander Saikaley 4,209

2000
Bob Chiarelli 142,972
Claudette Cain 102,940
Georges Saadé 2,597
Marc-André Bélair 1,846
James A. Hall 843
Ken Mills 773
Paula Nemchin 702
John Turmel 677
Morteza Naini 516

2003
Bob Chiarelli 104,595 
Terry Kilrea 66,634 
Ike Awgu 5,394
Ron Burke 2,698 
John A. Bell 2,027 
Donna Upson 1,312  
Paula Nemchin 1,191 
John Turmel 1,166

2006

 Larry O'Brien 141,262
 Alex Munter 108,572
 Bob Chiarelli 46,697
 Jane Scharf 1,467
 Piotr Anweiler 762
 Robert Larter 667
 Barkley Pollock 432

2010

2014

2018

2022

References

Elections, Municipal